Fermanagh and Omagh District Council (Ulster-Scots: Districk Cooncil o Fermanagh an Omey) is a local authority in Northern Ireland and was established on 1 April 2015. It replaced Fermanagh District Council and Omagh District Council and covers most of the southwest of Northern Ireland. Its first election was on 22 May 2014, and it acted as a shadow authority prior to the creation of the Fermanagh and Omagh district in April 2015.

Chairmanship

Chairman

Vice Chairman

Councillors
For the purpose of elections the council is divided into seven district electoral areas (DEA):

Seat summary

Councillors by electoral area

O'Cofaigh is a member of the Militant Left party, which contests elections under the Labour Alternative name 
† Co-opted to fill a vacancy since the election.‡ Changed party affiliation since the election.Last updated 17 September 2022.

For further details see 2019 Fermanagh and Omagh District Council election

Population
The area covered by the new council has a population of 113,161 residents according to the 2011 Northern Ireland census.

See also 
 Local government in Northern Ireland
 2014 Northern Ireland local elections
 Political make-up of local councils in the United Kingdom

References

District councils of Northern Ireland
2015 establishments in Northern Ireland
Politics of County Fermanagh
Politics of County Tyrone